Hannah Louise Baker (born 3 February 2004) is an English cricketer who currently plays for Warwickshire, Central Sparks and Welsh Fire. She plays as a right-arm leg break bowler. She previously played for Worcestershire.

Domestic career
Baker made her county debut in 2018, for Worcestershire against Warwickshire. This was the only game she played for the side that season; in 2019 she appeared in 9 matches, but only took 1 wicket.

Baker moved to Warwickshire in 2020, and made her debut for them in the 2021 Women's Twenty20 Cup. She took 4/14 in her first match, helping her side to victory over Wales. Overall, she was Warwickshire's leading wicket-taker in the tournament, with 8 wickets at an average of 6.75. She took seven wickets at an average of 16.50 for the side in the 2022 Women's Twenty20 Cup.

In 2020, Baker played for Central Sparks in the Rachael Heyhoe Flint Trophy. She appeared in 2 matches, taking 4 wickets at an average of 18.75. Her best performance came against Northern Diamonds, where she took 3/26 from 10 overs. In 2021, she played three matches for the side in the Charlotte Edwards Cup, taking one wicket. Baker also signed for Welsh Fire in The Hundred as a temporary replacement for Bethan Ellis. She played four matches for the side, taking 2 wickets at an average of 26.50. She played thirteen matches for Central Sparks in 2022, across the Charlotte Edwards Cup and the Rachael Heyhoe Flint Trophy, taking twelve wickets. She also played four matches for Welsh Fire in The Hundred. In January 2023, it was announced that Baker had signed her first professional contract with Central Sparks.

International career
In October 2022, Baker was selected in the England Under-19 squad for the 2023 ICC Under-19 Women's T20 World Cup. She went on to be the joint-third highest wicket-taker in the tournament, with 10 wickets at an average of 7.30. She was named Player of the Match in England's semi-final victory over Australia, taking 3/10 from her four overs. She was subsequently named in the ICC's Team of the Tournament.

References

External links

2004 births
Living people
Place of birth missing (living people)
Worcestershire women cricketers
Warwickshire women cricketers
Central Sparks cricketers
Welsh Fire cricketers